Biwa was an izakaya in Portland, Oregon.

Description
The restaurant served Japanese cuisine including ramen, sashimi, and udon noodles.

History
Biwa opened in 2007. In 2013, the restaurant began implementing a five percent surcharge to "provide health insurance and living wages" for all staff.

In 2016, Biwa relocated and "split" within the same building, becoming Parasol Bar and the Japanese restaurant Biwa Izakaya. Parasol closed in 2017. Owners Gabe Rosen and Kina Voelz announced plans to close the restaurant in mid 2018.

"Spin-offs" from Biwa included Kotori and Noraneko.

See also
 List of defunct restaurants of the United States
 List of Japanese restaurants

References

External links

 Biwa at Fodor's
 Biwa at Frommer's
 Biwa at Portland Monthly
 Biwa at Zomato

2007 establishments in Oregon
2018 disestablishments in Oregon
Buckman, Portland, Oregon
Defunct Asian restaurants in Portland, Oregon
Defunct Japanese restaurants
Japanese restaurants in Portland, Oregon
Restaurants disestablished in 2018
Restaurants established in 2007